Joyce Kakuramatsi Kikafunda is a Ugandan diplomat and academic who has served as High Commissioner of Uganda to the United Kingdom since 2013. A professor of agriculture and food science at Makerere University, she has been involved with projects to eradicate poverty and reduce childhood malnutrition. She was also a member of the Board of Trustees of the International Rice Research Institute from 2010-2015.

References

External links 
 The Uganda High Commission

Living people
High Commissioners of Uganda to the United Kingdom
Academic staff of Makerere University
Ugandan women academics
Year of birth missing (living people)
Ugandan women ambassadors